Das geistliche Jahr (or the Spiritual Year) is a religious and philosophical cycle of poems that began in 1818 and were published in 1851. The poems were written by Annette von Droste-Hülshoff, an influential 19th-century German author and one of Germany's most well-known female poets.

Poems
Das geistliche Jahr includes the following poems, together with their equivalents in English:

See also
Annette von Droste-Hülshoff
Die Judenbuche

References 
 Meinolf Schumacher: "Annette von Droste-Hülshoff und die Tradition. Das 'Geistliche Jahr' in literarhistorischer Sicht", in Dialoge mit der Droste, ed Ernst Ribbat, Paderborn 1998, p. 113-145.  (PDF)
 Meinolf Schumacher: "Ein Wüstenherold für die Noth. Zu Pragmatik und Aktualität von Annette von Droste-Hülshoffs 'Geistlichem Jahr'", in Droste-Jahrbuch 6, 2005/06, p. 105-122.  (PDF)

External links
 Das geistliche Jahr (The Spiritual Year, cycle of poems), 1851, available to download from Project Gutenberg.

German poems
1851 poems
German poetry collections